The Electoral district of County of Argyle was an electorate of the New South Wales Legislative Council at a time when some of its members were elected and the balance were appointed by the Governor.

It was created by the 1843 Electoral Districts Act and returned one member. On all four elections, there was only one candidate who was elected unopposed. In 1856 the unicameral Legislative Council was abolished and replaced with an elected Legislative Assembly and an appointed Legislative Council. The district was represented by the Legislative Assembly electorate of Argyle.

Members

Election results

1843

1846
Bradley resigned in July 1846.

1848

1851

See also
Members of the New South Wales Legislative Council, 1843–1851 and 1851-1856

External links
Hansard NSW Legislative Council

References

Former electoral districts of New South Wales Legislative Council
1843 establishments in Australia
1856 disestablishments in Australia